Peter Seamus O'Toole (1932 – 2013) was an actor of stage and screen who achieved film stardom in 1962 playing T. E. Lawrence in Lawrence of Arabia. He went on to become one of the most honoured film and stage actors of his time. He won an Honorary Oscar in 2002, but holds the record for most competitive Academy Award nominations for an actor without winning, going winless in eight attempts.

Film

Television

Theatre

References

External links
 
 
 
 

Male actor filmographies
British filmographies
Irish filmographies